Lévignen is a commune in the Oise department in northern France.

International relations

Lévignen is twinned with:

 Crookham Village, United Kingdom

See also
Communes of the Oise department

References

Communes of Oise